WAP four-disulfide core domain 21, pseudogene is a protein that is encoded by the WFDC21P gene in humans.

References 

Pseudogenes